The Art of Fiction is a book of literary criticism by the British academic and novelist David Lodge. The chapters of the book first appeared in 1991-1992 as weekly columns in The Independent on Sunday and were eventually gathered into book form and published in 1992. The essays as they appear in the book have in many cases been expanded from their original format.

Lodge focuses each chapter upon one aspect of the art of fiction, comprising some fifty topics pertaining to novels or short stories by English and American writers. Every chapter also begins with a passage from classic or modern literature that Lodge feels embodies the technique or topic at hand. Some of the topics Lodge analyzes are Beginning (the first chapter), The Intrusive Author, The Epistolary Novel, Magic realism, Irony, symbolism, and Metafiction. Among the authors he quotes in order to illustrate his points are Jane Austen, J. D. Salinger, Henry James, Virginia Woolf, Martin Amis, F. Scott Fitzgerald and even himself. In the preface of the book, Lodge informs that this book is for the general reader but technical vocabulary has been used deliberately to educate the reader. He further adds that the alternative title of the book would have been "The Rhetoric of Fiction" had it not been used already by writer Wayne Booth.

Chapters 
 Beginning Jane Austen Emma, Ford Madox Ford, "    Emma Woodhouse, handsome, clever and rich ..."
 The Intrusive Author George Eliot, E. M. Forster 
 Suspense Thomas Hardy
 Teenage Skaz J. D. Salinger
 The Epistolary Novel Michael Frayn
 Point of View Henry James
 Mystery Rudyard Kipling
 Names David Lodge, Paul Auster
 The Stream of Consciousness Virginia Woolf
 Interior Monologue James Joyce
 Defamiliarisation Charlotte Brontë
 The Sense of Place Martin Amis
 Lists F. Scott Fitzgerald
 Introducing a Character Christopher Isherwood
 Surprise William Makepeace Thackeray
 Time-Shift Muriel Spark
 The Reader in the Text Laurence Sterne
 Weather Jane Austen, Charles Dickens
 Repetition Ernest Hemingway
 Fancy Prose Vladimir Nabokov
 Intertextuality Joseph Conrad
 The Experimental Novel Henry Green
 The Comic Novel Kingsley Amis
 Magic Realism Milan Kundera
 Staying on the Surface Malcolm Bradbury
 Showing and Telling Henry Fielding
 Telling in Different Voices Fay Weldon
 A Sense of the Past John Fowles
 Imagining the Future George Orwell
 Symbolism D. H. Lawrence
 Allegory Samuel Butler
 Epiphany John Updike
 Coincidence Henry James
 The Unreliable Narrator Kazuo Ishiguro
 The Exotic Graham Greene
 Chapters etc. Tobias Smollett, Laurence Sterne, Walter Scott, George Eliot, James Joyce
 The Telephone Evelyn Waugh
 Surrealism Leonora Carrington
 Irony Arnold Bennett
 Motivation George Eliot
 Duration Donald Barthelme
 Implication William Cooper
 The Title George Gissing
 Ideas Anthony Burgess
 The Non-Fiction Novel Thomas Carlyle
 Metafiction John Barth
 The Uncanny Edgar Allan Poe
 Narrative Structure Leonard Michaels
 Aporia Samuel Beckett
 Ending Jane Austen, William Golding

1992 non-fiction books
Books of literary criticism
Books by David Lodge (author)
Secker & Warburg books